A converso (feminine form conversa), "convert", was a Jew who converted to Catholicism in Spain or Portugal, particularly during the 14th and 15th centuries, or one of his or her descendants.

To safeguard the Old Christian population and make sure that the converso "New Christians" were true to their new faith, the Holy Office of the Inquisition was established in Spain in 1478. The Catholic monarchs Ferdinand and Isabella expelled the remaining openly practising Jews by the Alhambra decree of 1492, following the Christian Reconquista (reconquest) of Spain. However, even a significant proportion of these remaining practising Jews chose to join the already large converso community rather than face exile.

Conversos who did not fully or genuinely embrace Catholicism, but continued to practise Judaism in secrecy, were referred to as judaizantes ("Judaizers") and pejoratively as marranos ("swine").

New Christian converts of Muslim origin were known as moriscos. Unlike Jewish conversos, moriscos were subject to an edict of expulsion even after their conversion to Catholicism, which was implemented severely in Valencia and in Aragón and less so in other parts of Spain.

Conversos played a vital role in the 1520–1521 Revolt of the Comuneros, a popular uprising in the Crown of Castile against the rule of Holy Roman Emperor Charles V.

History 
Ferrand Martínez, Archdeacon of Écija, directed a 13-year anti-Semitic campaign that began in 1378. Martínez used a series of provocative sermons, through which he openly condemned the Jews with little to no opposition. He rallied non-Jews against the Jews by creating a constant state of fear through riots. Martínez's efforts led to a series of outbreaks on 4 June 1391, where several synagogues in Seville were burned to the ground and churches were erected in their place. Amidst this outbreak, many Jews fled the country, some converted to Christianity in fear, and some were sold to Muslims. Martínez set in motion the largest forced mass conversion of Jews in Spain.

Both the Church and the Crown had not anticipated such a large-scale conversion stemming from an unplanned anti-Semitic campaign led by Ferrand Martínez. The new converts, most of whom were forced, due to their large numbers, were victims of a new problem. A problem that temporarily solved the Jewish presence in Spain, however, led to the creation of a new group that was neither completely Catholic nor Jewish.

The conversos, who were now fully privileged citizens, competed in all aspects of the economic sphere. This resulted in a new wave of racial anti-Semitism that was targeted at the conversos. This anti-Semitism evolved into small and large riots in Toledo, 1449, that now oppressed not the Jews by the Christians, but the New Christians (conversos) by the Old Christians. Thus, the Crown established a National Inquisition in 1478, that would test the loyalty and purity of a newly baptised Christian (converso). Due to continued oppression, some Jews and conversos fled Spain, others created a community to ensure the survival of Judaism in the Iberian Peninsula, although outwardly practising Christianity.

Perpetuation of Jewish heritage 
Conversas played a pivotal role in keeping Jewish traditions alive by observing many Jewish holidays like Shabbat. Conversas cooked and baked traditional Jewish dishes in honour of the Sabbath (starting on Friday sundown), Yom Kippur, and other religious holidays. During festivals like Sukkot and Passover, Conversas participated by giving clothing articles and ornaments to Jewish women, attending a seder, or obtaining a baking matzah. Conversas ensured that their household maintained similar dietary regulations as their Jewish counterparts, by eating only kosher birds and other animals. Conversas also financially contributed to the growth of the Jewish/Converso community and synagogue. The Jewish community and the conversos exchanged books and knowledge, Jews taught conversos how to read to ensure constant growth of their Jewish heritage. To take a stance against the church and its principles, some conversos performed professional work even on Sundays.

The traditional Jewish Purim was kept by the conversos in the disguise of a Christian holiday, they named it "Festival of Santa Esterica".

Description

Conversos were subject to suspicion and harassment from both what was left of the community they were leaving and that which they were joining. Both Christians and Jews called them tornadizo (renegade). James I, Alfonso X and John I passed laws forbidding the use of this epithet. This was part of a larger pattern of royal oversight, as laws were promulgated to protect their property, forbid attempts to convert them back to Judaism or the Muslim faith, and regulate their behaviour, preventing their cohabitation or even dining with Jews, lest they convert back.

Conversos did not enjoy legal equality. Alfonso VII prohibited the "recently converted" from holding office in Toledo. They had supporters and bitter opponents in the Christian secular of general acceptance, yet they became targets of occasional pogroms during times of social tension (as during an epidemic and after an earthquake). They were subject to the Spanish and Portuguese inquisitions.

While "pure blood" (so-called limpieza de sangre), free of the "taint" of non-Christian lineage, would come to be placed at a premium, particularly among the nobility, in a 15th-century defence of conversos, Bishop Lope de Barrientos would list what Roth calls "a veritable 'Who's Who' of Spanish nobility" as having converso members or being of converso descent. He pointed out that given the near-universal conversion of Iberian Jews during Visigothic times, (quoting Roth) "[W]ho among the Christians of Spain could be certain that he is not a descendant of those conversos?"

With advances in science able to trace individuals' ancestry via their DNA, according to a widely publicised study (December 2008) in the American Journal of Human Genetics, modern Spaniards (and Portuguese) have an average admixture of 19.8 percent from ancestors originating in the Near East during historic times (i.e. Phoenicians, Carthaginians, Jews and Levantine Arabs) – compared to 10.6 percent of North African – Berber admixture. This proportion could be as high as 23% in the case of Latin Americans, however, according to a study published in Nature Communications. The possibly higher proportion of significant Jewish ancestry in the Latin American population could stem from increased emigration of Conversos to the New World to avoid persecution by the Spanish Inquisition.

By country

In Spain 

The Chuetas are a current social group on the Spanish island of Majorca, in the Mediterranean Sea, who are descendants of Majorcan Jews that either were conversos (forcible converts to Christianity) or were Crypto-Jews, forced to keep their religion hidden. They practiced strict endogamy by marrying only within their own group.

The Chuetas has been stigmatized up until today in Balearic Islands. In the latter part of the 20th century, the spread of freedom of religion and laïcité reduced both the social pressure and community ties. An estimated 18,000 people in the island carry Chueta surnames in the 21st century.

All this, however, does not imply the complete elimination of rejection behaviors, as indicated by a survey carried out among Majorcans by the University of the Balearic Islands in 2001, in which 30% stated that they would never marry a Chueta and 5% declared that they do not even want to have Chueta friends.

In Italy 
Specific groups of conversos left Spain and Portugal after the Spanish Inquisition in 1492, in search for a better life. They left for other parts of Europe, especially Italy, where they were inevitably looked at with suspicion and harassment, both in their old and new communities. Subsequently, many conversos who arrived in Italian cities did not openly embrace their Judaism, since they were tempted by the advantages they could seek in the Christian world.

The first three cities to accept the conversos who openly converted back to Judaism, were Florence, Ferrara, and Ancona. Most of these conversos appeared after 1536 from Portugal, and most lived in Florence. In 1549, Duke Cosimo de' Medici allowed the Portuguese conversos to trade and reside within Florence. Most of the re-converted Jews lived in the ghetto of Florence, and by 1705 there were 453 Jews in the city.

Conversos arrived to Ferrara in 1535, and were able to assimilate with their neighbours, perform circumcisions, and return openly to Judaism, due to the Lettres Patentes issued by Duke Ercole II. After the plague in 1505 and the eventual fall of Ferrara in 1551, many of these Jews relocated North towards the economically stable ports in Venice. Venice slowly became a center for conversos who either stopped temporarily on their way to Turkey or stayed permanently as residents in the ghetto Jewish community port. Venetian leaders were convinced to openly accept conversos to practice Judaism because they recognised that if conversos were not welcome in Venice, they would take their successful trades to the country's economic rival of Turkey. A Portuguese converso in Venice, named Abraham de Almeda, connected strongly with Christianity, however, turned to the Jewish members of his family when in need of financing for moral support. As a result, many of the conversos during this period struggled with their Christian and Jewish identities.

Conversos in the city of Ancona faced difficult lives living under the pope and eventually fled to Ferrara in 1555. Portuguese conversos in Ancona were falsely misled that they were welcome to Ancona and that they could openly convert back to Judaism. Their fate was overturned by the succeeding pope, Pope Paul IV. The conversos in Ancona faced traumatic emotional damage after the pope imprisoned 102 conversos who refused to reside in the ghetto and wear badges to distinguish themselves. In 1588, when the duke granted a charter of residence in return for the conversos building up the city's economy, they refused, due to accumulated scepticism.

See also
 Marrano
 Chuetas
 Dönmeh
 Allahdad
 Chala
 Neofiti
 Anusim
 Crypto-Judaism
 Judaism in Mexico

Further reading

Alberro, Solange. Inquisición y sociedad en México, 1571–1700. Mexico City: Fondo de Cultura Económica 1993.
Alexy, T. The Marrano Legacy: A Contemporary Crypto-Jewish Priest Reveals Secrets of His Double Life. University of New Mexico Press 2002. . OCLC 51059087.
Amelang, James. Historias paralelas: Judeoconversos y moriscos en la España moderna. Madrid: Ediciones Akal, 2011.
Beinart, Haim. "The Conversos in Spain and Portugal in the 16th to 18th Centuries", in Moreshet Sepharad: TheSephardi Legacy, ed. Haim Beinart. Jerusalem: The Magnes Press, 1992. 
Beinart, Haim. "The Records of the Inquisition: A Source of Jewish and Converso History", Proceedings of the Israel Academy of Sciences and Humanities 2 (1968).
Beinart, Haim. Conversos ante la inquisición. Jerusalem: Hebrew University 1965.
Bodian, Miriam. Hebrews of the Portuguese Nation: Conversos and Community in Early Modern Amsterdam. Bloomington: Indiana University Press, 1997.
Bodian, Miriam. “'Men of the Nation': The Shaping of Converso Identity in Early Modern Europe". Past & Present 143 (1994): 48–76.
Brooks, Andrée Aelion. The Woman who Defied Kings: the life and times of Dona Gracia Nasi, Paragon House, 2002. 
Dirks, Doris A. "I will make the Inquisition burn you and your sisters: The role of gender and kindship in accusations against Conversas." Magistra 6.2 (2000): 28.
Domínguez Ortiz, Antonio. Los judeoconversos en la España moderna. Madrid: Editorial MAPFRE, 1992.
Gerber, Jane S. The Jews of Spain: A History of the Sephardic Experience. New York: The Free Press 1994. .
Gitlitz, David. Secrecy and Deceit: The Religion of the Crypto-Jews, Albuquerque, NM: University of New Mexico Press, 2002. 
Gojman de Backal, Alicia. "Conversos" in Encyclopedia of Mexico. Chicago: Fitzroy Dearborn 1997, vol. 1, pp. 340–344.
Gojman Goldberg, Alicia. Los conversos en la Nueva España. Mexico City: Enep-Acatlan, UNAM 1984.
Greenleaf, Richard E. The Mexican Inquisition in the Sixteenth Century. Albuquerque: University of New Mexico Press 1969.
Jacobs, J. Hidden Heritage: The Legacy of the Crypto-Jews. University of California Press 2002. . OCLC 48920842.
Kamen, Henry. The Spanish Inquisition. London: Weidenfeld and Nicolson 1965.
Lafaye, Jacques. Cruzadas y Utopias: El judeocristianismo en las sociedades Ibéricas. Mexico City: Fondo de Cultura Económica 1984.
Lanning, John Tate. "Legitimacy and Limpieza de Sangre in the Practice of Medicine in the Spanish Empire." Jahrbuch für Geschicte 4 (1967)
Liebman, Seymour. Los Judíos en México y en América Central. Mexico city: Siglo XXI 1971.
Martínez, Maria Elena. "Limpieza de Sangre" in Encyclopedia of Mexico, vol. 1, pp. 749–752. Chicago: Fitzroy Dearborn 1997.
Navarrete Peláez, María Cristina. "Judeoconversos en el Nuevo Reino de Granada." In Los judíos en Colombia: Una aproximación histórica, edited by Adelaida Sourdis Nájera and Alfonso Velasco Rojas, 26–52. Madrid: Casa Sefarad Israel, 2011.
Navarrete Peláez, María Cristina.. La diáspora judeoconversa en Colombia, siglos XVI y XVII: Incertidumbres de su arribo, establecimiento y persecución. Cali: Universidad del Valle, 2010.
Novoa, Nelson.  Being the Nação in the Eternal City: New Christian Lives in Sixteenth-Century Rome. Peterborough: Baywolf Press 2014
Pulido Serrano, Juan Ignacio. "Converso Complicities in an Atlantic Monarchy: Political and Social Conflicts behind the Inquisitorial Persecutions". In The Conversos and Moriscos in Late Medieval Spain and Beyond, Volume Three: Displaced Persons, edited by KevinIngram and Juan Ignacio Pulido Serrano, 117–128. Leiden: Brill, 2015.
Pulido Serrano, Juan Ignacio. "Political Aspects of the Converso Problem: On the Portuguese Restauraçao of 1640". In The Conversos and Moriscos in Late Medieval Spain and Beyond, Volume Two: The Morisco Issue, edited by Kevin Ingram, 219–246. Leiden: Brill, 2012.
Roth, Norman, Conversos, Inquisition, and the Expulsion of the Jews from Spain, Madison, WI: University of Wisconsin Press, 1995. 
Saban, Mario Javier. Judíos Conversos: Los antepasados judíos de las familias tradicionales argentinas. Buenos Aires: Editorial Distal, 1990.
Seed, Patricia. To Love, Honor, and Obey in Colonial Mexico: Conflicts over Marriage Choices, 1574–1821. Stanford: Stanford University Press 1988.
Sicroff, Albert A. Los estatutos de limpieza de sangre. Translated by Mauro Armiño. Madrid: Tauros 1985.
Soyer, François. “'It is not possible to be both a Jew and a Christian': Converso Religious Identity and the Inquisitorial Trial of Custodio Nunes (1604–5).” Mediterranean Historical Review 26 (2011): 81–97.
Tobias, H.J. A History of the Jews in New Mexico. University of New Mexico Press 1992. . . OCLC 36645510
Ventura, Maria da Graça A. "Los judeoconversos portugueses en el Perú del siglo XVII: Redes de complicidad". In Familia, Religión y Negocio: El sefardismo en las relaciones entre el mundo ibérico y los Países Bajos en la Edad Moderna, edited by Jaime Contreras, Bernardo J. García García, e Ignacio Pulido, 391–406. Madrid: Fundación Carlos Amberes, 2002.

References

External links
Ana Gómez-Bravo, "Conversos and identity in the poetry of the fifteenth century"  (poems of Comendador Román and Antón de Montoro, excerpts from Andrés Bernáldez’s Memorias and the Libro de Alborayque [late 15th century]), in English and Spanish (pedagogical edition) with introduction, notes, and bibliography in Open Iberia/América (open access teaching anthology))
Selections in English and Spanish of Ferrán Martínez’s speech at the Tribunal del Alcázar in Seville, 19 February, 1388 (pedagogical edition) with introduction, notes, and bibliography in Open Iberia/América (open access teaching anthology)
Out of Spain educational materials
Converso lectures and activities
Alhambra Decree:  521 Years Later, a blog post on the Law Library of Congress's In Custodia Legis''
Song From a Withered Limb: Las Posadas and the Converso Crisis of the 16th Century/

 
Converts to Roman Catholicism from Judaism
History of the conversos
History of the Jews in South America
Jewish Mexican history
Jewish Spanish history
Judaism in Spain
Puerto Rican Jews
Sephardi Jews topics
Spanish Inquisition
Spanish people of Jewish descent